Robert Arthur Harris (May 1, 1915 – August 8, 1989) was an American professional baseball pitcher. He played in Major League Baseball (MLB) from 1938 to 1942 for the Detroit Tigers, St. Louis Browns, and Philadelphia Athletics. He was the first Wyoming-born player in Major League history.

He finished in the top ten in losses three seasons in a row.

References

Major League Baseball pitchers
Detroit Tigers players
St. Louis Browns players
Philadelphia Athletics players
Baseball players from Wyoming
1915 births
1989 deaths
People from Gillette, Wyoming